The Boundary Creek, a perennial stream of the Clarence River catchment, is located in the Northern Rivers region of New South Wales, Australia.

Course and features
The river flows generally north and northeast before reaching its confluence with the Nymboida River, near the locality of Nymboida.

See also

 Rivers of New South Wales
 List of rivers of New South Wales (A-K)
 List of rivers of Australia
 Chaelundi National Park

References

 

Rivers of New South Wales
Northern Rivers